Zhong Haoran (born 15 July 1994) is a Chinese footballer who plays as a midfielder for free agent.

Club career
In 2011, Zhong Horan started his professional footballer career with Hubei Youth in the China League Two. In July 2013, Zhong was signed for China League One side Hunan Billows. He played with Hunan Billows mostly with their reserve squad, before moving abroad and signing with Serbian side FK Spartak Subotica in July 2016. He made his debut in the 2016–17 Serbian SuperLiga on September 10, in the 8th round home game against Javor entering as a substitute in the 68th minute of the game. In summer 2017 Zhong returned to the SuperLiga by joining FK Borac Čačak but made no league appearances in the first half of the season. On 10 February 2018, Zhong transferred to China League One side Zhejiang Greentown. He would make his debut in a league game on 7 April 2018 against Heilongjiang Lava Spring in a 2-1 victory. He would then play a vital part as the club gained promotion to the top tier at the end of the 2021 campaign.

Career statistics

Statistics accurate as of match played 31 January 2023.

References

External sources
 
 

1994 births
Living people
Association football midfielders
Chinese footballers
Chinese expatriate footballers
Chinese expatriate sportspeople in Serbia
People from Shiyan
Hunan Billows players
FK Spartak Subotica players
FK Proleter Novi Sad players
FK Borac Čačak players
Zhejiang Professional F.C. players
China League Two players
China League One players
Serbian First League players
Serbian SuperLiga players
Expatriate footballers in Serbia